The Broad Front (Frente Amplio) is a left-wing political party in Costa Rica, the main component of the front is the Alternative of the Lefts Movement (Movimiento Alternativa de Izquierdas). They are defined by progressive, socialist and social justice ideas. The party is a member of the Foro de Sao Paulo, part of the international Latin American Left Movement (pink tide) of democratic socialism.

History
In the 2006 general elections, they won 1.1% of the legislative votes, and won one seat in the legislature, occupied by José Merino del Río. In the 2010 general elections they kept their seat, occupied by José María Villalta Florez-Estrada. Their presidential nominee was Eugenio Trejos Benavides, then the rector of the Costa Rica Institute of Technology. For the 2014 election the party’s nominee was then congressman Villalta, who was receiving a lot of support according to the polls, something unusual in Costa Rica for a left-wing candidate, and even appearing in some as the frontrunner. Nevertheless, lost momentum after a very negative campaign especially from right-wing party Libertarian Movement and PAC's recovery after the party's candidate Luis Guillermo Solís improved his image in the debates, attracting votes from the more moderate leftist electors.

Villalta ended third in the presidential race with 17% of the votes, below PLN's nominee Johnny Araya and PAC’s Luis Guillermo Solís, but increased its parliamentary representation from one to nine seats. It also won one mayor in the 2016 municipal elections in the Barva canton and in alliance with PAC in Acosta and Montes de Oca.

During the 2014-2018 legislative period the party suffered several minor scandals involving its deputies including Guanacaste’s representative and former Catholic priest Ronal Vargas's resignation after being accused of sexual harassment, deputy Ligia Falla’s use of her parliamentary office for alleged romantic encounters of her advisors, and domestic abuse accusations against two parties' deputies.

Electoral performance

Presidential

Parliamentary

References

2004 establishments in Costa Rica
Democratic socialist parties in North America
Foro de São Paulo
Green parties in North America
Political parties established in 2004
Political parties in Costa Rica
Progressive International
Progressive parties
Socialism in Costa Rica